Jafarabad-e Bala may refer to:
 Jafarabad-e Bala, Fars
 Jafarabad-e Bala, Hamadan